Mozaffari (also Romanized as Moz̧affarī; also known as Muzaffarī) is a village in Kavar Rural District, in the Central District of Kavar County, Fars Province, Iran. At the 2006 census, its population was 3,862, in 890 families.

References 

Populated places in Kavar County